Sasalak Haiprakhon (born 8 January 1996) is a Thai professional footballer who plays as a wing back or winger for Buriram United and the Thailand national team.

International career
In 2018 he was called up by Thailand national team for the 2018 AFF Suzuki Cup.

International goals

Under-23

Under-21

Honours

Club
Buriram United
 Thai League 1: 2017, 2018, 2021-22
Thai FA Cup: 2021–22
Thai League Cup: 2021–22
 Thailand Champions Cup: 2019

Jeonbuk Hyundai Motors
 K League 1: 2021

International
Thailand
 AFF Championship (1): 2022
Thailand U23
 Sea Games  Gold Medal: 2017
 Dubai Cup: 2017

Individual
AFF Championship Best XI: 2022

References

External links
 
 

1996 births
Living people
Sasalak Haiprakhon
Sasalak Haiprakhon
Association football fullbacks
Sasalak Haiprakhon
Sasalak Haiprakhon
Sasalak Haiprakhon
Sasalak Haiprakhon
Sasalak Haiprakhon
Sasalak Haiprakhon
Sasalak Haiprakhon
Sasalak Haiprakhon
Sasalak Haiprakhon
Southeast Asian Games medalists in football
2019 AFC Asian Cup players
Competitors at the 2017 Southeast Asian Games
Thai expatriate sportspeople in South Korea